Danny Grissett (born 1975) is an American jazz pianist, keyboardist, and composer.

Early life
Grissett was born in Los Angeles in 1975. He first played the piano at the age of five, taking classical music lessons. He graduated with a B.A. in Music Education from California State University, Dominguez Hills, then completed a two-year master's degree in jazz performance in 2000 at the California Institute of the Arts followed by studies at the Thelonious Monk Institute at the University of Southern California Thornton School of Music.

Later life and career
After playing around Los Angeles he moved to New York City in 2003. He became trumpeter Nicholas Payton's keyboardist early the following year, and has been a regular member of trumpeter Tom Harrell's band since 2005. Grissett released his first album as a leader in 2006, on the Criss Cross label, for whom he has continued to record. Promise and his following album, Encounters, were trio recordings with Vicente Archer (bass) and Kendrick Scott (drums). His next album, Form, from 2008, added saxophonist Seamus Blake, trumpeter Ambrose Akinmusire, and trombonist Steve Davis to the trio.

Playing style
A Down Beat reviewer in 2010 commented that Grissett employed "strategies drawn from Mulgrew Miller, Herbie Hancock and Sonny Clark to tell cogent stories that carry his own harmonic and rhythmic signature."

Discography
An asterisk (*) indicates that the year is that of release.

As leader/co-leader

As sideman

References

External links

An extended analysis of a Grissett performance

1975 births
American jazz pianists
American male pianists
California Institute of the Arts alumni
California State University, Dominguez Hills alumni
Jazz musicians from California
Living people
21st-century American pianists
21st-century American male musicians
American male jazz musicians
The New Jazz Composers Octet members
Criss Cross Jazz artists